S.S. College, Jehanabad, also known as Swami Sahajanand College, established in 1955, is a general degree colleges in Jehanabad, Bihar. It  is affiliated to Magadh University, and offers undergraduate courses in science, commerce and arts.

Departments

Science

Chemistry
Physics
Mathematics
Zoology
Botany

Arts & Commerce
Hindi
 English
Economics
Political Science
History
Philosophy
Commerce

References

Colleges affiliated to Magadh University
Universities and colleges in Bihar
Educational institutions established in 1955
1955 establishments in Bihar